Sita Kumari Nepali is a Nepalese politician and Minister for Internal Affairs, Law and Sports of Karnali Province. She is a member of Provincial Assembly of Karnali Province belonging to the CPN (Maoist Centre). Nepali, a resident of Lekbeshi, was elected under the proportional representation (PR) category for Dalit. In 2020, she was appointed as the chief whip of the party’s provincial committee by the former Chief minister, Mahendra Bahadur Shahi of Karnali Province. She is also the spokesperson for the Karnali provincial government. In 2021, she announced that the provincial government has decided to establish mass communications academy.

Personal life
Sita Kumari Nepali was born on January 30 to father Lok Bahadur Nepali and mother Shobisharaa Nepali.

References

Living people
Members of the Provincial Assembly of Karnali Province
21st-century Nepalese women politicians
21st-century Nepalese politicians
Communist Party of Nepal (Maoist Centre) politicians
People from Surkhet District
1975 births